Racial passing occurs when a person who is classified as a member of a racial group is accepted or perceived ("passes") as a member of another racial group. Historically, the term has been used primarily in the United States to describe a black or brown person or of multiracial ancestry who assimilated into the white majority to escape the legal and social conventions of racial segregation and discrimination.

In the United States

Passing for white

Although anti-miscegenation laws outlawing racial intermarriage existed in the United States as early as 1664, there were no laws preventing or prosecuting the rape of enslaved girls and women. Rape of slaves was legal and encouraged during slavery to increase the slave population. For generations, enslaved black mothers bore mixed-race children who were deemed "mulattos", "quadroons", "octoroons", or "hexadecaroons" based on their percentage of "black blood".

Although these mixed-race people were often half white or more, institutions of hypodescent and the 20th-century one drop rule in some states – particularly in the South – classified them as black and therefore, inferior, particularly after slavery became a racial caste. But there were other mixed-race people who were born to unions or marriages in colonial Virginia between free white women and African or African-American men, free, indentured, or slave, and became ancestors to many free families of color in the early decades of the United States, as documented by Paul Heinegg in his Free African Americans of Virginia, North Carolina, South Carolina, Maryland and Delaware.

For some people, passing as white and using their whiteness to uplift other black people was the best way to undermine the system that relegated black people to a lower position in society. These same people that were able to pass as white were sometimes known for leaving the African American community and getting an education, later to return and assist with racial uplifting. Although the  reasons behind the decision to attempt to pass are deeply individual, the history of African Americans passing as white can be categorized by the following time periods: the antebellum era, post-emancipation, Reconstruction through Jim Crow, and present day.

Antebellum United States 
During the antebellum period, passing as white was a means of escaping slavery. Once they left the plantation, escaped slaves who could pass as white found safety in their perceived whiteness. To pass as white was to pass as free. However, once they gained their freedom, most escaped slaves intended to return to blackness—passing as white was a temporary disguise used to gain freedom. Once they had escaped, their racial ambiguity could be a safeguard to their freedom. If an escaped slave was able to pass as white, they were less likely to be caught and returned to their plantation. If they were caught, white-passing slaves such as Jane Morrison could sue for their freedom, using their white appearance as justification for emancipation.

Post-emancipation 
Post-emancipation, passing as white was no longer a means to obtain freedom. As passing shifted from a necessity to an option, it fell out of favor in the black community. Author Charles W. Chestnutt, who was born free in Ohio as a mixed-race African American, explored circumstances for persons of color in the South after emancipation, for instance, for a formerly enslaved woman who marries a white-passing man shortly after the conclusion of Civil War. Some fictional exploration coalesced around the figure of the "tragic mulatta", a woman whose future is compromised by her being mixed race and able to pass for white.

From Reconstruction through Jim Crow 
During the Reconstruction era, black people slowly gained some of the constitutional rights of which they were deprived during slavery. Although they would not secure "full" constitutional equality for another century until after passage of the Civil Rights Act of 1964 and Voting Rights Act of 1965, reconstruction promised African Americans legal equality for the first time. Abolishing slavery did not abolish racism. During Reconstruction whites tried to enforce white supremacy, in part through the rise of Ku Klux Klan chapters, rifle clubs and later paramilitary insurgent groups such as the Red Shirts.

Passing was used by some African Americans to evade segregation. Those who were able to pass as white often engaged in tactical passing or passing as white in order to get a job, go to school, or to travel. Outside these situations, "tactical passers" still lived as black people, and for this reason, tactical passing is also referred to as "9 to 5 passing." The writer and literary critic Anatole Broyard saw his father pass in order to get work after his Louisiana Creole family moved north to Brooklyn before World War II.

This idea of crossing the color line at different points in one's life is explored in James Weldon Johnson's Autobiography of an Ex-Colored Man. But the narrator closes the novel by saying "I have sold my birthright for a mess of pottage", meaning that he regrets trading in his blackness for whiteness. The idea that passing as white was a rejection of blackness was common at the time and remains so to the present time.

African-American people also chose to pass as whites during Jim Crow and beyond. For example, United States civil rights leader Walter Francis White conducted investigations in the South during which he passed as white to gather information on lynchings and hate crimes, and to protect himself in socially hostile environments. White, who was blond-haired, blue-eyed, and had a light complexion, was of mixed-race, mostly European ancestry. Twenty-seven of White's 32 great-great-great-grandparents were white; the other five were classified as black and had been slaves. White grew up with his parents in Atlanta in the black community and identified with it. He served as the chief executive of the National Association for the Advancement of Colored People (NAACP) from 1929 until his death in 1955.

In the 20th century, Krazy Kat comics creator George Herriman, a Louisiana Creole cartoonist born to mulatto parents, passed as white throughout his adult life.

The aforementioned 20th-century writer and critic Anatole Broyard was a Louisiana Creole who chose to pass for white in his adult life in New York City and Connecticut. He wanted to create an independent writing life and rejected being classified as a black writer. In addition, he did not identify with northern urban black people, whose experiences had been much different from his as a child in New Orleans' Creole community. He married an American woman of European descent. His wife and many of his friends knew he was partly black in ancestry. His daughter Bliss Broyard did not find out until after her father's death. In 2007, she published a memoir that traced her exploration of her father's life and family mysteries entitled One Drop: My Father's Hidden Life: A Story of Race and Family Secrets.

From 2000 to the present
Passing as white is more controversial in the 21st-century because it is frequently seen as being a rejection of blackness, family and culture. In August 2021, Black writer for Steven Universe Future and Craig of the Creek, Taneka Stotts, told Insider that often Black and brown characters in animation exist ambiguously, calling this a "White passing narrative...where the narrative is written in a way that it's white-passing enough to get past your executives and the powers that be." Mae Catt, a queer Asian-American writer for Young Justice, added that when shows are not run or written by people of color, Black characters are "surface decoration" with racial representation going "very similarly to queer representation" as the cultural identity of characters is not shown, with an "unspoken implicit destructive bias" that their behavior is "correct," behavior that is "inevitably white."

Passing as Indigenous Americans

Other persons have passed as Native American or First Nations people.  These people are sometimes called Pretendians, a portmanteau of the words pretend and Indian.

In the New Age and Hippie movements, non-Native people sometimes have attempted to pass as Native American or other Indigenous medicine people. The pejorative term for such people is "plastic shaman".

The author and environmentalist Grey Owl was born in United Kingdom as a white man named Archibald Belaney; he made a life in Canada and claimed to be a First Nations person. When asked to explain his White appearance, he lied and claimed he was half Scottish and half Apache. Belaney performed what he said were Ojibwe cultural practices and wilderness skills, and adopted an anachronistic and stereotypical lifestyle, as part of a persona which he was successful in marketing to non-Native audiences.

The American actor Iron Eyes Cody, who was of Sicilian descent, developed a niche in Hollywood by playing roles of Native Americans. Initially playing Indians only in movies and television, eventually he wore his film costumes full-time and insisted he was of Cherokee and Cree descent.

In the visual arts and literature, other White-Americans have also attempted to pass as being indigenous. Ku Klux Klan leader and segregationist speech writer, Asa Earl Carter, attempted to reinvent himself as Cherokee author Forrest Carter, author of the novel The Education of Little Tree.

Jay Marks, a man of Eastern-European Jewish ancestry, adopted the pen name of Jamake Highwater about 1969, claiming to be Cherokee-Blackfeet, and published numerous books under that name. He won awards and NEA grants.

Cromwell Ashbie Hawkins West was an African American from Rhode Island. The grandson of prominent attorney and community leader, William Ashbie Hawkins, West reinvented himself as Red Thunder Cloud and, despite only knowing "a few words of Catawba" that he had learned from books, he convinced anthropologists that he was the last fluent speaker of the Catawba language. Over objections from the Native Americans he studied, who told the academics he was not Native, West continued to work with anthropologists to publish language and cultural materials about a number of different tribes with whom he had never had contact.

American-born sculptor Jimmie Durham was exposed as a non-Native man posing as a Cherokee. Artist Yeffe Kimball claimed to be Osage.

To try to protect Native American artists from the claims of non-Native impersonators, the Indian Arts and Crafts Act of 1990 was passed in the United States. It requires any visual artist claiming to be a Native American artist to be either an enrolled member of a state or federally recognized tribe, or for a recognized tribe to designate the artist as a tribal artisan.

In academia, due to non-tribal colleges' and universities' reliance on self-identification of tribal identity, non-Native people have sometimes passed as Native Americans. Elizabeth Warren, Harvard professor and U.S. Senator, claimed Cherokee and Delaware ancestry. Her claims were rejected by the Cherokee Nation.

Professor and activist Ward Churchill, who advocated for American Indian rights, claimed to be alternately Cherokee, Muscogee Creek, and Métis. His claims were eventually rejected by the tribes he claimed, specifically the United Keetoowah Band of Cherokee Indians. Churchill was fired in 2007 from the University of Colorado for academic misconduct over his research and writings.

The Wall Street Journal reported on October 5, 2015, that Dartmouth College fired the director of its Native American Program, Susan Taffe Reed, "after tribal officials and alumni accused her of misrepresenting herself as an American Indian". She previously taught at Dartmouth, Bowdoin College, and University of North Carolina at Chapel Hill.

Terry Tafoya – now going by the name Ty Nolan – a former psychology professor at Evergreen State College, passed as being Warm Springs and Taos Pueblo. The Seattle Post Intelligencer discovered that he was neither, and reported his deception.

The Native American and Indigenous Studies Association's Statement on Indigenous Identity Fraud says:
If we believe in Indigenous self-determination as a value and goal, then questions of identity and integrity in its expression cannot be treated as merely a distraction from supposedly more important issues. Falsifying one’s identity or relationship to particular Indigenous peoples is an act of appropriation continuous with other forms of colonial violence.

Passing as African Americans and passing as members of other races
The phenomenon which is called "reverse passing" as well as "blackfishing" or "race-shifting" has been noted to be common among successful and educated women, especially among women who are academics in university humanities departments and those women who are involved in leftist activism.
Civil rights activist Rachel Dolezal, then president of the Spokane chapter of the NAACP, claimed in a February 2015 profile to have been born in a "Montana tepee" and have hunted for food with her family as a child "with bows and arrows". She primarily identified as African American and had established herself as an activist in Spokane. In 2015, Dolezal's mother disputed her daughter's accounts, saying that the family's ancestry was Czech, Swedish, and German, with "faint traces" of Native American heritage. She also denied various claims made by her daughter about her life, including having lived in Africa when young, although the parents did live there for a time after Dolezal had left home. Dolezal ultimately resigned from her position at the Spokane NAACP chapter.

In 2015, Vijay Chokalingam, the brother of Indian American entertainer Mindy Kaling (née Chokalingam), told CNN that he had pretended to be black years before in order to take advantage of affirmative action to be admitted into medical school. The medical school issued a statement that Chokalingam's grades and scores met the criteria for acceptance at the time, and race had played no factor in his admission.

John Roland Redd was an African American musician born and raised in Missouri. In the 1950s he assumed a new identity, claiming to be an Indian named Korla Pandit and fabricating a history of birth in New Delhi, India to a Brahmin priest and a French opera singer. He established a career in this exotic persona, described as an "Indian Liberace". In 2001, three years after his death, his true ethnic identity was revealed in an article by Los Angeles magazine editor R. J. Smith.

In September 2020, after Black Latino scholars confronted her, African history professor and author Jessica Krug admitted she had been falsely passing as African American. As an activist, Krug had also been using the alias "Jessica La Bombalera".

Australia

Edward Stirling, one of the first British settlers in South Australia, was the illegitimate child of a Scottish slaveholder in Jamaica and an unidentified woman of colour. Financed by his father's slave compensation, he passed as Scottish after arriving in Australia and became one of the colony's wealthiest individuals. He and his sons Lancelot and Edward Charles Stirling were all members of parliament.

Leslie Joseph Hooker, the founder of one of Australia's real estate firms LJ Hooker, concealed his Chinese ancestry during his lifetime, including changing his birth surname of Tingyou.

Similarly to the African-American practice, many Aboriginal Australians have passed as white to avoid legal and social discriminations. In the iconic autobiography My Place, a central theme is Sally Morgan, whose family passed as Indians, discovering her Aboriginal heritage.

Germany
For Jews in Nazi Germany, passing as "Aryan" or white and non-Jewish was a means of escaping persecution. There were three ways to avoid being shipped off to the death camps: run, hide or pass. No option was perfect, and all carried the risk of getting caught. People who could not run away but wanted to maintain a life without hiding attempted to pass as "Aryan." People who were "visibly Jewish" could try to alter their appearance to become "Aryan", while other Jewish people with more ambiguous features could pass into the "Aryan" ideal more easily. In these attempts to pass as "Aryan", Jewish people altered their appearance by dyeing their hair blonde and even attempting to reverse circumcisions. Edith Hahn Beer was Jewish and passed as "Aryan"; she survived the Holocaust by living with and marrying a Nazi officer. Hahn-Beer wrote a memoir called: The Nazi Officer's Wife: How One Jewish Woman Survived the Holocaust. Another such example is Stella Kübler, a Jewish collaborator who initially attempted to hide her Jewish background.

There are also examples of the opposite: some persons such as Misha Defonseca , Laurel Rose Willson or the author who wrote Fragments: Memories of a Wartime Childhood falsely claimed to be Jewish Holocaust survivors after 1945.

Canada
The scientific director of the Canadian Institutes of Health Research's Indigenous health arm, Carrie Bourassa, was a pretendian.

Examples of racial passing have been used by people to assimilate into groups other than European. Marie Lee Bandura, who grew up as part of the New Westminster Indian Band in British Columbia, was orphaned and believed she was the last of her people. She moved to Vancouver's Chinatown, married a Chinese man, and raised her four children believing they were Chinese and French. One day she told her daughter Rhonda Larrabee about her heritage: "I will tell you once, but you must never ask me again." Marie Lee Bandura had chosen to hide her roots due to the prejudice she faced.

England
Patrick O'Brian (1914–2000), born Richard Patrick Russ, an English novelist and translator, best known for his Aubrey–Maturin series of sea novels set in the Royal Navy during the Napoleonic Wars, was for many years presumed by reviewers and journalists to be Irish, and he took no steps to correct the impression, until a 1999 exposé in The Daily Telegraph made public the facts of his ancestry, original name and first marriage, provoking considerable critical media comment.

In popular culture

Literature
 Frank J. Webb's 1857 novel, The Garies and Their Friends, explores the choices in the racist antebellum North (Philadelphia) of three mixed-race characters who can pass for white: George Winston, who opts to leave the United States rather than be subjected to discriminatory laws; Emily Garie, who marries into the coloured society that she identifies with and defends; and her brother, Clarence Gary, who secretly passes after attending a white boarding school. He falls in love with a white woman, is exposed as being part black, and dies of tuberculosis and despair.
 Kate Chopin's 1893 short story, "Désirée's Baby", tells the story of an abandoned baby, apparently white, raised by a wealthy French Creole family. The baby (Désirée) grows up to marry a wealthy man of good name. When their child is born, in a few months it becomes apparent the child is part black. The husband, Armand, sends Désirée and the baby away, implying she is of mixed race. The final scene reveals that Armand was the one of mixed ancestry, and that this had been kept from him by his parents.
 Mark Twain's 1894 novel, The Tragedy of Pudd'nhead Wilson, is a scathing satire of passing in the antebellum South. Roxy, a slave, is  black; in order to avoid being sold down the river, she decides to switch her own baby (who is  black) with a white child she is caring for. Her baby Tom, who passes for white, is raised as a spoiled aristocrat, but when his true identity becomes known, as the child of a slave and thus born into slavery, he is sold down the river.
 Writing in the late 19th century, Charles W. Chesnutt explored issues of mixed-race people passing for white in several of his short stories and novels set in the South after the American Civil War. It was a tumultuous time, with dramatic social changes following the Emancipation Proclamation; many of the people who had been enslaved were mixed race because of generations of white men having taken sexual advantage of slave women, or having more conventional liaisons with them.
 In 1912, James Weldon Johnson anonymously published The Autobiography of an Ex-Colored Man, which depicts the life of a biracial man who, after witnessing a lynching, chooses to live as white. Doing so costs him his connection to and dream of making music steeped in African-American roots.
 Jessie Redmon Fauset published Plum Bun in 1928, a novel in which the African-American protagonist, Angela Murray, tries to leverage her light skin tone to gain social advantage.
 Nella Larsen's 1929 novella, Passing, deals with two biracial women's racial identities and their social experience: one generally passes for white and has married white; the other is married to a black man and lives in the black community of Harlem.
 Fannie Hurst's 1933 bestselling novel, Imitation of Life, includes the character Peola, a light-skinned African-American girl who rejects her darker-skinned mother in order to pass for white. The novel was adapted as two independent major motion pictures of the same name (see Film).
 Ray Sprigle, a white journalist, disguised himself as black and travelled in the Deep South with John Wesley Dobbs, a guide from the NAACP. Sprigle wrote a series of articles under the title I Was a Negro in the South for 30 Days. The articles formed the basis of Sprigle's 1949 book In the Land of Jim Crow.
 Langston Hughes wrote several pieces related to passing, including two relevant short stories. One, titled "Passing" in the 1934 collection The Ways of White Folks, concerns a son who thanks his mother for literally disregarding him on the street as he is passing for white. The other, titled "Who's Passing for Who" (1952), portrays a couple whose racial ambiguity leads to questioning whether they are passing for white or for black.
 Unpublished in Regina M. Anderson's lifetime, the one-act play The Man Who Passed narrates the plight of Fred Carrington. A former Harlem resident, after years of passing as white, returns to the friends he had abandoned to face the many consequences of his choice.
 Black Like Me (1961) was an account by journalist John Howard Griffin about his experiences as a Southern white man passing as black in the late 1950s to explore how blacks were treated in the Deep South.
 Danzy Senna's 1998 novel, Caucasia, features Birdie, a biracial girl who looks white and accompanies her white mother as they go into hiding. Her sister, Cole, looks black and goes with their black father into a different hiding place.
 Eric Jerome Dickey's 1999 novel Milk in My Coffee, features a biracial woman who has been traumatized by the black community and her family; she moves to New York City and passes for white.
 The Human Stain (2000) is a novel by Philip Roth featuring a light-skinned African-American man who spent his adult professional life passing as a Jewish-American intellectual.
 Mat Johnson and Warren Pleese's graphic novel Incognegro is inspired by Walter White's work as an investigative reporter for the NAACP on lynchings in the South in the early 20th century. It tells of Zane Pinchback, a young, light-skinned, African-American man whose eyewitness reports of lynchings are regularly published in a New York periodical under the byline "Incognegro".
 Harlan Ellison, the speculative fiction writer, examines the emotional impact of passing in his allegorical short story, "Pennies, Off a Dead Man's Eyes". In it, a white man (secretly an alien non-human who was stranded on Earth as a child) attends the funeral of a beloved black man who raised him, and who taught him how to blend in and appear human.
 Nell Zink's 2015 novel Mislaid is told in the voice of a white Southern lesbian, who pretends to be heterosexual to marry. She eventually leaves her husband and assumes a new African-American identity for herself and her daughter, passing as a mixed-race woman.
 In her 2017 book Real American: A Memoir, author Julie Lythcott-Haims depicts her experiences as a person of mixed race.
 In Brit Bennett's 2020 novel The Vanishing Half, one of a set of identical twin sisters decides to cut her family ties and pass as white.

Film
 The 1934 film Imitation of Life featured the character Peola, who has mixed ancestry and passes as white. The 1959 remake renamed the character Sarah Jane.
 The 1936 and the 1951 adaptations of the musical Show Boat, set in the segregated South, feature a character named Julie who is of mixed race and accepted as white. The discovery of her partially African ancestry sets off a crisis, as she is married to a white man.
 Lost Boundaries (1949) features a black couple passing for white in New Hampshire who become pillars of the community, with the husband serving as the esteemed town doctor. Upon being commissioned in the United States Navy, his racial identity is revealed. This fictional account is based on the history of a real family.
 Pinky was a 1949 film on the topic starring Jeanne Crain as a Southern woman who passed for white in the North while studying to be a nurse. Crain was nominated for the Academy Award for Best Actress.
 In the film Band of Angels (1957), starring Clark Gable, Yvonne de Carlo and Sidney Poitier, Amantha Starr grows up as a privileged white Southern belle in the segregated antebellum South. After her father dies, her world is shattered when it is revealed that her mother was an African-American slave.
 Sapphire (1959) is a British movie which explores the theme of racial passing.
 Shadows is a 1959 American independent drama film directed by John Cassavetes about race relations during the Beat Generation years in New York City. The film stars Ben Carruthers, Lelia Goldoni, and Hugh Hurd as three mulatto siblings, though only one of them is dark-skinned enough to be considered African American. 
 The 1960 film I Passed for White features an African-American character who is accepted as white.
 The 1973 film The Spook Who Sat by the Door features a bank robbery conducted by an African American underground guerrilla group. Lighter-skinned members, who use wigs to pass as white, are purposefully used. Witnesses to the crime describe them as Caucasian males, deflecting suspicion from the guerrillas.
 Julie Dash's Illusions (1982), set in 1942, featured a woman in a Hollywood film studio who had passed as white to gain her position. It was named one of the decade's best films in 1989 by the Black Filmmakers Association.
 The 1986 film Soul Man features a white man who wears blackface to qualify for an African American-only scholarship at Harvard Law School.
 In the 1990 film Europa Europa, based on the real-life story of Solomon Perel during World War II, the main character is a young Jewish refugee who discards his identity papers and is eventually accepted as a hero of the Nazi regime and exemplar of Aryan traits.
 The 1995 film Panther features a black Federal Bureau of Investigation agent named Pruitt, who passes for white when among African Americans.
 The 1995 film Devil in a Blue Dress features a mixed-race woman, light-skinned enough to pass, who becomes embroiled in a mystery in which her appearance is an important factor.
 The 1996 film A Family Thing features a white man, played by Robert Duvall, who learns when his mother dies that she was not his biological mother. His natural mother was African American and died as she gave birth to him. He also finds he has a black half-brother (played by James Earl Jones) who is a policeman, as well as a maternal aunt.
 The 2000 TV movie A House Divided is based on Kent Anderson Leslie's non-fiction book Woman of Color, Daughter of Privilege: Amanda America Dickson, (1849–1893), about a mixed-race woman in the South whose mother was a slave. Her wealthy white father raises her in a life of privilege. When he tries to will his property to her, his white relatives challenge her for control of the estate. They cite local laws forbidding property ownership by blacks (legally, the younger woman is defined by her mother's slave status and racial caste). After court challenges, Amanda Dickson succeeded in inheriting her father's fortune.
 The 2003 film The Human Stain stars Anthony Hopkins as an African-American man of mixed-race ancestry who has passed as white for most of his adult life to achieve his professional and academic goals. It is adapted from Philip Roth's novel of the same name.
 In 2004, Marlon and Shawn Wayans starred in the film White Chicks in which two black FBI agents go undercover as rich white girls and are believed to be white by the white people they encounter, including the girls' friends.
 The 2005 film Slow Burn has themes of interracial dating, "passing" or pretending to be a member of another race.
 The 2007 documentary short Black/White & All That Jazz tells the story of singer-actor Herb Jeffries, who identified as "a man of color" in order to be accepted as a singer. He was of Irish and Sicilian ancestry.
 In the 2008 film Tropic Thunder, Robert Downey Jr. plays a blue-eyed, blond-haired Australian method actor who undergoes plastic surgery to portray an African-American soldier in a Vietnam War movie within the movie.
 The 2021 film Passing tells the story of a biracial woman who meets a biracial friend who is "passing" as white.

Television
 On the soap opera One Life to Live, the character of Carla Gray was introduced in 1968 as an Italian-American traveling actress. She has dalliances with both white and black doctors (scandalizing television viewers when Gray, who they believed was white, kissed a black doctor). Her true racial heritage was revealed when maid Sadie Gray, a black woman, claimed Carla as her daughter.
 On the last episode of the first season of the sitcom The Jeffersons (1975), Andrew Rubin played Tom and Helen Willis' son Allan, who left the family for two years and traveled in Europe, passing as white. This enraged his sister Jenny, who looks black.
 In an episode of WKRP in Cincinnati, clueless news reporter Les Nessman actually tries to dye his skin black to appear as an African American for a news story; this is a spoof of the John Howard Griffin story Black Like Me.
 On the December 15, 1984, episode of Saturday Night Live, the black actor Eddie Murphy appeared in "White Like Me", a sketch in which he used theatrical make-up to appear as a white man.
 In 1985, actor Phil Morris played black attorney Tyrone Jackson on the soap opera The Young and the Restless. He uses make-up to pass as a white man and infiltrate a crime organization.
 In "Are You Now or Have You Ever Been", the second episode of season-2 of the television show Angel (October 3, 2000), actress Melissa Marsala plays Judy Kovacs, a bank robber on the lam who is passing. The episode takes place in 1952 and introduces the Hyperion Hotel as a setting for the show.
 In November 2005, Ice Cube and Emmy Award-winning filmmaker R. J. Cutler teamed to create the six-part documentary series titled Black. White., broadcast on cable network FX. Two families, one black and one white, shared a home in the San Fernando Valley for the majority of the show. The Sparks and their son Nick, from Atlanta, Georgia, were made up to appear to be white. The Wurgels and their daughter Rose were transformed from white to black. The show premiered in March 2006.
 In "Libertyville" (March 29, 2009), an episode from the sixth season of Cold Case set in 1958, the actor Johnathon Schaech portrays Julian Bellowes, who has just married into a wealthy family in Philadelphia. He has not told them he is a Louisiana Creole of color. Similarly, the third-season episode "Colors" (October 16, 2005) (set in 1945) includes Christina Hendricks and Elinor Donahue playing a dancer who passes as white for at least sixty years.
 A Season 8 episode of Law & Order, entitled "Blood" (November 19, 1997), features a rich African American who has been passing for white for his entire adult life in order to first get a corporate job in the South and then to maintain his career. He is accused of killing his white girlfriend in order to give away their dark-skinned newborn baby that would expose him as being of African-American descent.
 The sitcom Unbreakable Kimmy Schmidt (2015–2019) features Jacqueline White, a Lakota Native American woman who passes for white. She is played by white actress Jane Krakowski; the casting of a white woman in the role drew criticism.

Art
 Racial passing is a recurring theme in American artist Adrian Piper's work. For example, in her 1988 visual performance piece Cornered, Piper states "I'm black" and explains that this statement may surprise her audience because Piper, who is a light-skinned African American, could pass as white.

Music
 The rock band Big Black released a song on this subject called "Passing Complexion" on their 1986 album Atomizer.

See also

Concepts

 Amalgamation (history)
 Assimilated Jews
 Blood quantum laws, also known as Indian blood laws (as in, Native American)
 Brown Paper Bag Test, also known as a Paper Bag Party
 Color-blind casting
 Color terminology for race
 Cultural appropriation
 Cultural assimilation
 Discrimination based on skin color, also known as colorism
 Good hair
 Lookism
 Passing (gender)
 Racial fluidity
 Racial integration
 Racial transformation (individual)
 Racial transformation of Michael Jackson
 Martina Big
 Skin whitening
 The Operated Jew
 Transracial (identity)
 White privilege
 Whiteness studies

Individuals

 Anatole Broyard
 Alvera Frederic
 Anita Florence Hemmings
 Theophilus John McKee
 Merle Oberon
 Elsie Roxborough
 Mary Mildred Williams

References 
Notes

Further reading
 Brune, Jeffrey A., and Daniel J. Wilson (eds.), Disability and Passing: Blurring the Lines of Identity. Philadelphia: Temple University Press, 2013.
 Crary, David (November 4, 2003). "Passing for White Not a Relic of the Past". The Gainesville Sun (Gainesville, Florida).  Associated Press.
 Davenport, Lauren. 2020. "The Fluidity of Racial Classifications". Annual Review of Political Science.
 Dahis, Ricardo, Emily Nix, Nancy Qian. 2019. "Choosing Racial Identity in the United States, 1880–1940". NBER Working Paper No. 26465.
 De Micheli, D. (2020). "Racial Reclassification and Political Identity Formation". World Politics.
 Gates, Henry Louis Jr. (1997). "The Passing of Anatole Broyard". Thirteen Ways of Looking at a Black Man. New York: Random House. pp. 180–214. The life story of a famous writer, whose family was Louisiana Creole (whom Gates labels black), who passed as white for most of his adult life in the Northeast.
  Definitions and examples, history, famous cases and a look at the theme in works of fiction.
  A variety of ways to "pass".

Cultural assimilation
Race in the United States
Racism
Passing (sociology)
Black (human racial classification)
White Americans